Nagor or Nagher is a village in Bhuj Taluka of Kutch at a distance of about 8 km from Bhuj town, the capital of Kachchh District of Gujarat in India.

History
Nagor is one of the 18 villages founded by the Mistri community of Kutch in late 12th century. This group of warriors were also skilled architects and have contributed to the erection of many historical monuments of Kutch.

During the years of the laying of railway lines in British India between around 1850 and 1930, many members of Mistris moved out and made themselves into big railway contractors throughout British India. Some of them entered into the coal mine business as well. The Mistris of these villages built and developed the old infrastructure around the villages in late 1890 from their earnings. However, a majority of old houses of Mistris with unique architect, were destroyed in the earthquake of 26 January 2001.

Notable people
The most noted person to hail from this village was Rai Bahadur Jagmal Raja Chauhan(1887–1974), a railway contractor who built Bally Bridge, an industrialist and also founder of Ambica Airlines, who also served as ADC to Sir Khengarji, Maharao of Cutch.

Present status
In present times, Nagor is famous for Ahir Embroidery and one of the main centers for this Kutchi hand embroidery. Sorathiya Ahirs live in Nagor. It is one of five main centers for Sorathiya ahir in kutch. It is said that Ahirs were shepherds who originated from the Gokul-Mathura region and are associated with Lord Krishna. They migrated to Kutch and Saurashtra in Gujarat. The other communities are mistri, muslim, Rabari, prathaliya Ahirs, vaghari, koli, harijan, goswami.

After, the devastating earthquake in 2001, many of the century-old houses were damaged.

The Bhuj-Nagor Road that connects the village has an industrial area on both sides. 

Essar Petrol Pump is established in Nagor for petrol distribution. There are nearly 10 companies in GIDC, Nagor including Mira Packaging, Disha Tyers etc. ITI is also established by Prakhsal Academy with the help of the government (of Gujarat). In the election  of 2017, Vijyaben Katriya (Sorathiya) was selected as surpanch and Pravin Gosai as vice sarpanch. 'Panchvati Bag' is also associated with Gram Panchayat and Nagor temples of god such as Rama, Shiva, Hanumanji, Khodiyar Mataji, Randal ma, Brahmani ma, Parmeswar Dada, etc.. 

In primary school in Nagor, there are nearly 350 students. In Rushey Mead School (secondary education), there are 100 students.

School
In 2004, the Rushey Mead Foundation, a UK based charity opened a School in Nagor, which has now become a famous landmark of Nagor. The Co-founder of Foundation is Bhasker Solanki of BBC, London.

References

Villages in Kutch district